Pekahiah (Pəqaḥyā; "YHWH has opened the eyes") was the seventeenth and antepenultimate king of Israel and the son of Menahem, whom he succeeded, and the second and last king of Israel from the House of Gadi. He ruled from the capital of Samaria.

Pekahiah became king in the fiftieth year of the reign of Uzziah, king of Judah. William F. Albright has dated his reign to 738–736 BCE, while E. R. Thiele offers the dates 742–740 BCE.

Pekahiah continued the practices of Jeroboam, which are called the sins of Jeroboam.

After a reign of two years, Pekahiah was assassinated in the royal citadel at Samaria by Pekah ben Remaliah  one of his own chief military officers – with the help of fifty men from Gilead. Pekah succeeded Pekahiah as king.

References

740s BC deaths
8th-century BC Kings of Israel
8th-century BC murdered monarchs
Biblical murder victims
House of Gadi
Dethroned monarchs
Male murder victims
Gilead